Silver Condor was an album-oriented rock (AOR) and soft rock band from the early 1980s. They released two albums, Silver Condor (1981) and Trouble at Home (1983). They made their only Billboard Hot 100 appearance with a song off of their first album, "You Could Take My Heart Away," which reached #32 in 1981.

History
The band's line-up shifted considerably between their first and second albums, with lead singer Joe Cerisano being the only constant member.  The first incarnation of the band also featured the renowned guitarist Earl Slick.  The second album featured well-known bassist Kenny Aaronson as well as future Autograph frontman Steve Plunkett on rhythm guitar.

Line-ups

Personnel for debut album
Joe Cerisano: lead vocals
Earl Slick: lead guitar
John Corey: keyboards, rhythm guitar
Jay Davis: bass
Claude Pepper: drums

Personnel for Trouble at Home
Joe Cerisano: lead vocals
Kenny Aaronson: bass
Nick Brown: guitar
Steve Plunkett: vocals, guitar
Steve Goldstein: keyboards
Craig Krampf: drums
Waddy Wachtel: guitar

Also features several guest appearances
Clarence Clemons: tenor sax
Rick Derringer: guitar
Neal Schon: guitar

References

External links
Review of their self-titled debut album

American rock music groups